Moctezuma's headdress is a featherwork headdress or military device which tradition holds belonged to Moctezuma II, the Aztec emperor at the time of the Spanish conquest. However, its provenance is uncertain, and even its identity as a headdress has been questioned. It is made of quetzal and other feathers with sewn-on gold detailing. It is now in the Weltmuseum Wien, and is a source of dispute between Austria and Mexico, as no similar pieces remain in Mexico.

Description
The feathers of the piece have deteriorated over the centuries. The smallest is made from blue feathers of the Cotinga amabilis (xiuhtōtōtl) with small plates of gold in the shapes of half moons. The quetzal feathers in the center of the headdress are raised relative to the sides. Leather straps attach the crown to the head of the wearer.

Though it likely served as a headdress, it has also been identified in other ways. As a headdress, its appearance matches that which is seen in contemporary Aztec codices being worn by priests during the festival of Xocotlhuetzi. However, its appearance also matches that of other kinds of objects also seen in contemporary depictions. In Codex Cozcatzin, emperor Axayácatl is depicted during the Battle of Tlatelolco wearing a quetzal-feathered battle standard and some sort of large device in the back, both of which have a similar appearance. In all situations, it appears that the object is associated with the deity Quetzalcoatl. Regardless, there is no direct edivence which suggests that it actually belonged to Moctezuma.

History

Although attributed to Moctezuma and the Spanish conquest, the provenance of the piece is unattested, and it does not match Aztec illustrations of the headdress of their nobility. It became an object of interest to European researchers such as Ferdinand von Hochstetter and Eduard Seler at the end of the 19th century, and its identification as a quetzalapanecayotl is attributed to American anthropologist Zelia Nuttall. It was restored in 1878, while still thought to be a mantle rather than a headdress. It is attested since 1575 in the collections of Archduke Ferdinand in Ambras near Innsbruck, Austria. At the beginning of the 19th century it was deposited in the Museum of Ethnology (inventory number 10402VO) in Vienna along with other liturgical artifacts of Quetzalcoatl and Ehecatl.

Although artifact exchanges and restitution of the headdress were negotiated with the Mexican government, a bilateral expert commission deemed the artifact too fragile for transport and thus recommended its remaining in Vienna.

See also
Xokonoschtletl Gómora — Mexican activist who has struggled for the return of Moctezuma's headdress.

References

External links 
 Propuesta de trueque histórico por el Penacho
 "El penacho de Moctezuma es un atavío para la cabeza", nota de prensa emitida por el Conaculta
 "El penacho de Moctezuma es una capa de sacerdote, afirma un investigador", a letter in the journal La Jornada
 "Discutirá el Parlamento de Austria si devuelve el penacho de Moctezuma", in the journal La Jornada
 "Ve Austria difícil devolver penacho de Moctezuma", on Esmas.com
 "¿De quien es el penacho de Moctezuma?", by Carmen Cook de Leonard
 http://www.yankuikanahuak.o-f.com/Xoko.htm
 http://www.thehistoryblog.com/archives/16445

Mexican art
History of Mexico
Featherwork
Individual crowns
Aztec artifacts
Aztec clothing